Peter Grütter (born 30 June 1942) is a retired competitive Swiss figure skater who currently works as a coach. He was born in Berne. He competed for Switzerland at the 1964 Winter Olympics, placing 24th. He retired from competitive skating following that season. As a skater, Grütter was coached by Jacques Gerschwiler. 

Grütter began coaching in 1965. His most notable student has been Stéphane Lambiel, whom he coached from 1995 until June 2008 and again from July 2009. He coached Lambiel to win two World Championships, as well as an Olympic Silver Medal and other titles. Others among his current and former students include Noémie Silberer, Kristel Popovic, Raphaël Bohren, Samuel Contesti, Laurent Alvarez, Paolo Bacchini, Alisson Perticheto and Anna Ovcharova.

References

External links 

 Sports-reference profile

1942 births
Living people
Swiss figure skating coaches
Swiss male single skaters
Olympic figure skaters of Switzerland
Figure skaters at the 1964 Winter Olympics
Sportspeople from Bern